Telephone service may refer to:
 Improved Mobile Telephone Service (IMTS)
 Local telephone service
 Mobile Telephone Service (MTS)
 Plain old telephone service (POTS)
 Helpline
 Telephone line
 a customer service callcenter or "telephone answering service"
 a telecommunication provider
 Telephone switchboard
 Switchboard operators

See also 
 Telephone network
 Telecommunications network
 Telephone Doctor